Mekon may refer to:

Arts and entertainment
 The Mekon, ruler of the Treens in the Dan Dare stories in the Eagle comic
 The Mekons, a British punk rock band
 Mekon (musician) (born c.1963), British electronic musician John Gosling

Other uses
 Mekon (crustacean), a genus in family Tanaididae

See also
 Mekong, a river
 Mecon (disambiguation)